Šestajovice is a municipality and village in Náchod District in the Hradec Králové Region of the Czech Republic. It has about 200 inhabitants.

Administrative parts
The village of Roztoky is an administrative part of Šestajovice.

References

Villages in Náchod District